is an Australian born Canadian rugby union player who plays as a Lock. He currently plays for the LA Giltinis of Major League Rugby (MLR).

References

1994 births
Living people
Rugby union locks
Sunwolves players
Rugby union flankers
Rugby union number eights
Australian rugby union players
Canadian rugby union players
Canada international rugby union players
Perth Spirit players
Brisbane City (rugby union) players
Yokohama Canon Eagles players
Kamaishi Seawaves players
LA Giltinis players
Toronto Arrows players